Quinn Meinerz (born November 15, 1998) is an American football guard for the Denver Broncos of the National Football League (NFL). He played college football at UW–Whitewater.

Early life and high school
Meinerz grew up in Hartford, Wisconsin and attended Hartford Union High School, where he was a member of the football, track and field, and wrestling teams. He was named honorable mention All-State as both an offensive and defensive lineman as a senior. Meinerz chose
to play college football at NCAA Division III Wisconsin–Whitewater over St. Cloud State and Wisconsin–La Crosse.

College career
Meinerz played in two games as a freshman before becoming a starter as a sophomore, when he was named first team All-Wisconsin Intercollegiate Athletic Conference (WIAC). Meinerz was named first team All-WIAC and a first team Division III All-American by the Associated Press. The 2020 NCAA Division III football season was canceled due to COVID-19 pandemic and he spent the year training at his family's hunting and fishing camp in Ontario. Meinerz played in the 2021 Senior Bowl.

Professional career 

Meinerz was selected 98th overall in the third round of the 2021 NFL Draft by the Denver Broncos. He was the highest drafted football player in school history and the first since 2007. In Meinerz rookie season on the Broncos, he played in 15 of the 17 regular season games and started every game after Week 9, totaling 9 starts on the season.

References

External links 
 Wisconsin–Whitewater Warhawks bio

1998 births
Living people
American football centers
People from Hartford, Wisconsin
Wisconsin–Whitewater Warhawks football players
Players of American football from Wisconsin
Sportspeople from the Milwaukee metropolitan area
Denver Broncos players